Samrat Prithviraj Chauhan Government College, Ajmer is a college in Ajmer city of Rajasthan state in India.  GCA is celebrating 183 years of existence. 

Started as an English school in 1836 by the Court of Directors of the East India Company in the building now known as the Blue Castle, GCA became an Intermediate College in 1868.  The increase in numbers and the starting of Intermediate classes required larger accommodation and the foundation stone of the present buildings was laid on 17 February 1868 by General Keating, the  Agent to the Governor-General in Rajputana.

In the early nineties of the last century, the public of Ajmer collected a sum of Rs 44,000/- and handed it over to the Government as their contribution for the college. Degree classes in Arts subjects were started in 1896 and in Science subjects in 1913. A year earlier the school classes had been separated from the college and shifted to another part of the town.

In the year 1946 came the first postgraduate department. There are 19 of them now including Law. Degree classes in Commerce were added in 1949 and Law classes in 1951. This is the only Government College in Rajasthan with facilities for postgraduate studies and research in Science subjects Physics, Chemistry, Zoology, Botany, Commerce, English, Sanskrit, Hindi, History, Economics and Political Science.

GCA changed its affiliation from Calcutta University to Allahabad University on the latter's establishment in 1886 and further to Agra University when it came into existence in 1927. Finally, the college came under the jurisdiction of University of Rajasthan after the integration of the erstwhile State of Ajmer-Merwara with Rajasthan in 1956. When in 1987 the Maharshi Dayanand Saraswati university established in Ajmer the college got affiliated with MDS university.it is now one of top university in rajasthan.

References 

 gca

Colleges in Ajmer
Educational institutions established in 1836
1836 establishments in India